The Decentralized Administration of the Aegean is one of the seven decentralized administrations of Greece, consisting of the regions of North Aegean and South Aegean. Seated in Piraeus, Athens, it is currently led by Acting Secretary-General Nikos Theodoridis.

Formation and tasks

Decentralized Administrations were created in January 2011 as part of a far-reaching reform of the country's administrative structure, the Kallikratis reform (Law 3852/2010).

They enjoy both administrative and financial autonomy and exercise devolved state powers in urban planning, environmental and energy policy, forestry, migration and citizenship. Beyond that, they are tasked with supervising the first and second-level self-governing bodies: the municipalities and regions, in this case the 43 municipalities of the Aegean and the two regions themselves.

Characteristics
The Decentralized Administration of the Aegean is seated outside its own territory in Piraeus, Athens. It is however the most decentralized administration with organizational structures all over the Aegean Islands.

In the European NUTS nomenclature, the two regions of the Aegean together with Crete form the first level NUTS region EL4 (Nisia Aigaiou, Kriti).

Secretary-General
The Decentralized Administration is led by a Secretary-General who is appointed or dismissed by a Cabinet decision upon request of the Greek Minister of Interior, and is therefore considered the senior representative of the national government in the regions.

Following the electoral victory of Syriza in January 2015, the new Minister for the Interior, Nikos Voutsis, declared that the decentralized administrations would be abolished, and their powers transferred to the regions. Until this reform is formalized, and as the Secretaries-General appointed by the previous administration resigned on 2 February, the decentralized administrations are run by their senior civil servants as Acting Secretaries-General. The current Acting Secretary-General is Nikos Theodoridis.

List of Secretaries-General
  (PASOK), January 2011 – August 2012
 Christiana Kalogirou (Nea Dimokratia), August 2012 – April 2014
  (Nea Dimokratia),  April 2014 – February 2015
 Nikos Theodoridis (Independent), since February 2015

References

Literature

External links
  

2011 establishments in Greece
North Aegean
South Aegean
Aegean